Wayne Enterprises, Inc., also known as WayneCorp and Wayne Industries, is a wealthy fictional company appearing in American comic books published by DC Comics, commonly in association with the superhero Batman. Wayne Enterprises is a large, growing multinational company.

The American diversified multinational conglomerate is owned and chaired by Bruce Wayne, the son of Thomas and Martha Wayne. Wayne Enterprises is a green company based out of Gotham City and headquartered in Wayne Tower.

Wayne Enterprises and the Wayne Foundation are largely run by Bruce Wayne's business manager, Lucius Fox. Fox makes most company decisions on Bruce Wayne's behalf, since Wayne's time is largely occupied by his duties as the vigilante, Batman.

Wayne Enterprises has been presented in films and television as a business conglomerate, modeled after the standards of a multinational company. In the 2020 storyline "Joker War", the Joker became the rightful owner of the company, and proceeded to waste most of the Wayne Fortune by waging a war on Gotham City, crippling the company's future and destroying the Wayne family legacy.

Company History

Founded by merchant ancestors of the dead Wayne family in the 17th century as a merchant house, it is among the oldest companies in the DC Universe. The company began as a dozen businesses started by brothers Judge Solomon Wayne and Joshua Wayne. With the revenue generated Judge Wayne essentially built Gotham City by hiring Cyrus Pinkney.

Judge Wayne's son and heir, Alan Wayne, officially made it a corporate company in the 19th century. Alan Wayne, who was Bruce Wayne's great-great-grandfather, erected Wayne Shipping, Wayne Chemical, and Wayne Manufacturing. All these companies were energized by the world's Industrial Revolution; more branches were created and diversified while others dwindled and subsequently discarded. Along the years, it has developed from a merchant house to a large multinational conglomerate company in the DC Universe; exceeding LexCorp, Stagg Enterprises, and Ferris Aircraft.

Under the control of Patrick and Laura Wayne, Wayne Enterprises became a "green company" and environmentally conscious from that time forward.

After Bruce Wayne returned from the past after a final battle with Darkseid, he revealed that he had been publicly funding Batman for years and founded Batman Inc to publicly fund Batman's allies throughout the world.

Following the end of the Joker War, Wayne Enterprises officially shut down Batman Inc. as a result of Bruce Wayne's choice to publicly fund Batman. Lucius Fox officially regained control of the Wayne fortune but warned Bruce that even if he did return his wealth to him, he would no longer be able to use the companies to fund his crusade as Batman as the board of directors would be monitoring the money. The board also set about attempting to remove Bruce Wayne from active participation within the company and simply pay him a large amount to fund his playboy lifestyle. Lucius Fox is attempting to fight the situation on Wayne's behalf and return his fortune to him with no legal results.

Wayne Tower
Within the DC Universe, Wayne Tower is the headquarters of Wayne Enterprises. Also called "Old Wayne Tower" and "Wayne Industries Headquarters"; it was built in 1888 by Alan Wayne. After its construction, the tower was the tallest building in Gotham City. Built as a symbol to welcome all of those who enter the city, Wayne Tower has 13 gargoyles or "guardians", which Alan Wayne insisted they be called, welcome visitors for each of the 13 entry points into the city. The five guardians on the first tier watch the original five gateways into Gotham, the three bridges and two tunnels. Higher up, the seven guardians watch the seven train lines that converge at Union Station below the tower's base. A 13th guardian was added in 1930 and sits in the middle of the tower. This last one, added by Henry Wayne, watches the airport and cannot be seen by elevator or from the deck.

At the top of the tower is an observation deck which Alan Wayne asserted be open to the public for free every weekend. It has double bonded laminated float glass for windows that are crystal-quality, weatherproof, and unbreakable.

Wayne Foundation

The Wayne Foundation is the holding company for the Thomas Wayne Foundation and the Martha Wayne Foundation; it is the largest transparently operated private foundation within the DC Universe. The primary aims of the foundation are, globally, the arts and humanities: to enhance healthcare and reduce extreme poverty, to expand educational opportunities and access to information technology, and to fund scientific research and help altruistic people with research by providing facilities and training.

The foundation has its own building, called the Wayne Foundation Building, which includes a penthouse where Bruce Wayne lived for a period of time. It also has a secret elevator that leads to a matching Batcave in a secret sub-basement under the building.

Through the Wayne Foundation and the affiliated organizations underneath, Bruce Wayne addresses social-economic problems encouraging crime, assists victims of crimes, and maintains connections to the streets through the soup kitchens and social services groups; all of which augments his crime fighting efforts in a way that his Batman persona cannot. This arrangement also provides a large network of connections in the world of charities. He finds out about the newest trends, sciences and the arts.

Thomas Wayne Foundation
The Thomas Wayne Foundation is a foundation for medicine and medical help. This foundation gives annual awards for medical breakthroughs and lifelong commitment, similar to the Nobel Foundation. The Thomas Wayne Foundation is also responsible for funding the Thomas Wayne Memorial Clinic in Park Row, Gotham's infamous Crime Alley. The foundation funds and runs dozens of clinics in Gotham. Bruce Wayne's surrogate mother, Dr. Leslie Thompkins, runs the Memorial Clinic in Crime Alley and governed the other clinics until she left Gotham.

Martha Wayne Foundation
The Martha Wayne Foundation is a patron and supporter of arts, families, education, and tolerance. The foundation supports and helps to run a number of orphanages and free schools, and provides teachers for those who have learning difficulties. Artists can apply for grants from the foundation to help support them in furthering the arts. The foundation sponsors companies like Family Finders. Family Finders is an organization directed at finding lost people and uniting families. The Martha Wayne Foundation also sponsors and runs dozens of soup kitchens within the city.

Bat Bunker
Under the Wayne Foundation building, there is a secret bunker, which is similar to the secret bunker of New Babylon in The Hague. As of Batman #687, Dick Grayson has taken to using this as his "Batcave," stating that he wishes to embody the role of Batman in a way that is specific to him as well as getting closer to the action in the city. The bunker is as well-equipped as the original Batcave, including the Subway Rocket vehicle (which is Grayson's favorite means of transport during the Prodigal storyline) stationed beneath the bunker.

In other media

Television

DC animated universe

 In Batman: The Animated Series and The New Batman Adventures, Wayne Enterprises was run by both Bruce Wayne and Lucius Fox. Attempts at taking over the company were made by rival companies, including Roland Daggett of Daggett Industries. After GothCorp's CEO Ferris Boyle was arrested, Wayne Enterprises helped keep GothCorp running without firing any employees. Wayne Enterprises once partnered with LexCorp for the development of cybernetic scouting drones, the Waynelexes, but Bruce terminated the contract after Lex Luthor created several large-scale military prototypes, violating the joint approval clause stipulated in their agreement, as well as his involvement in the Joker's rampage on Metropolis. Wayne Enterprises also hired Arnold Wesker after his release from Arkham Asylum, and funded an organ transplant operation to cure Nora Fries of her terminal illness.
 In Batman Beyond, the elder Bruce Wayne defended against numerous hostile takeovers by shrewd industrialist Derek Powers of Powers Technology. However, sometime after Bruce retired as Batman, Powers succeeded in merging the two companies, creating Wayne-Powers Enterprises. Powers has used the company's resources for many illegal business transactions, including making biological weapons for rogue nations. After Powers' criminal identity as Blight was revealed, his son Paxton took over as CEO. Paxton was soon arrested after attempting to murder Bruce and for several major art thefts. Bruce then finally reclaimed the company as both Chairman and CEO and renamed the company again Wayne Enterprises in addition, claiming what belonged to the Powers Technology.

'Arrowverse'

Wayne Enterprises appears on the CW's Arrowverse.
 In the pilot of the CW's live-action TV series The Flash, a spin-off of Arrow, a newspaper article from the future tells of a Wayne Tech/Queen Incorporated merger being completed in 2024.
 It appears in the part 2 (Arrow) of the Elseworlds crossover, in which Wayne Enterprises is run by Kate Kane in Gotham City, although the company has gone downhill after Bruce Wayne and Batman vanished three years ago and the board of directors made a series of bad investments. The exterior and lobby of Chicago's Carbide & Carbon Building (at the time, the St. Jane Hotel) portray the firm's seemingly derelict and largely abandoned headquarters.
 The building appears in the series Batwoman as a base of operations for Kate and Luke Fox with a Batcave. Chicago's Board of Trade Building once again serves as the Wayne Enterprises headquarters, looking much as it did in Christopher Nolan's Dark Knight Trilogy. During the third season, it is confirmed that Ryan Wilder- the second Batwoman- has been appointed acting CEO to legitimise her reasons for spending time in the tower, but she is briefly ousted as part of a corporate takeover organised by rival CEO Jada Jet, who seeks the company's resources to help cure her psychopathic son Marquis of an illness he contracted after a confrontation with the Joker. However, after Marquis's true nature is exposed, Ryan and her allies are able to retake control of the company.

Other
 In an episode of the Teen Titans animated series, when Robin defected to Slade, the remaining four Titans fought against Robin on top of Wayne Enterprises, destroying the letters "A" and "Y" in the process.
 Wayne Enterprises appears in The Batman under the name Wayne Industries. In "The Big Heat," Wayne Industries competed against GothCorp for the handling of the Children's Hospital. Although GothCorp won the City Council's vote, the decision was overturned when Batman revealed that GothCorp hired Firefly to commit industrial sabotage against its competitors. The Children's Hospital contract was then awarded to Wayne Industries.
 The Metropolis division of Wayne Enterprises is briefly seen in the Young Justice episode "Schooled". The episode "Infiltrator" features the Philadelphia branch of Waynetech, which is attacked by swarm of nanites unleashed by the League of Shadows.
 Wayne Enterprises has been featured in several episodes of Gotham. A young Bruce Wayne begins investigating the corruption at the company, and finds out his father Thomas Wayne was aware of their criminal dealings, although was investigating them prior to his death. The company is mentioned several times during the second season and plays a background role to the goings on. On behalf of the Order of St. Dumas, Mayor Theo Galavan attempts to get Bruce's 51% share of the company in exchange of giving information about his parents' killer, but the deal falls through when Galavan is arrested by James Gordon. Later in the season it is revealed that the Court of Owls run the company, and are looking for a way to bring back the dead using Hugo Strange who carries out inhumane experiments at the Wayne Enterprises division Indian Hill. In the third season, Bruce dedicates himself to removing the Court of Owl's influence. Sensei has the Court of Owl's leaders killed as a way to make Bruce join the League of Assassins by granting his wish. From the fourth season onward, Bruce is in full control of Wayne Enterprises without the influence of any criminal organizations.
 Wayne Enterprises appears in the TV series Powerless; in the series, Wayne Enterprises is the parent company of Wayne Security, the company for which the series' central characters work.

Film
 In the 1966 film Batman, Bruce Wayne is presented as head of the Wayne Foundation, which is described as a world-renowned organization dedicated to peace and understanding among nations.

Batman Anthology

 In the 1989 film Batman, no mention is made of any family company owned by Bruce Wayne. In the beginning of the film at the Harvey Dent Press Dinner, there is a seat for Bruce Wayne, which is empty (because he is busy working as Batman), suggesting that he funded Dent's campaign. In the casino scene in Wayne Manor, Vicki Vale asks him what he does for a living, and he is about to answer, but is interrupted by Alfred.
 In the 1992 sequel Batman Returns, still no mention is made of Wayne Enterprises in any capacity. However, Bruce is shown attending a meeting with Max Shreck, suggesting that he is known as a stockholder with holdings in various companies.
 In the 1995 film Batman Forever, Wayne Enterprises was finally presented in the series, with Bruce Wayne serving as head of the entire company (CEO), while Fred Stickley was head of the research department until being murdered by Edward Nygma, an employee in that department. Bruce also has a transport tunnel behind his desk in the main office that transports him back to Wayne Manor. In the deleted scenes, the Wayne foundation is mentioned by Bruce and Alfred.
 In the 1997 sequel Batman & Robin, Wayne Enterprises was revealed to have been funding Dr. Jason Woodrue's research only to withdraw it when Bruce realized his intentions. It is when Poison Ivy finds a beaker with the Wayne Enterprises logo on it that causes her to travel to Gotham City. The company is briefly mentioned again later during the donation of the giant telescope for the Gotham Observatory, which Mr. Freeze later turns into a giant freezing weapon.

The Dark Knight Trilogy

 In Batman Begins, board member William Earle (Rutger Hauer) takes over the company after the deaths of Thomas and Martha Wayne. He assures Bruce that the company will be in good hands until he is old enough to claim it. However, after Bruce's disappearance, Earle has Bruce declared legally dead so he can carry on his plan of turning Wayne Enterprises into an open capital company. However, due to Bruce's act of leaving all his money and assets to Alfred, Earle was unable to liquidate his majority shareholding which would have allowed for a complete takeover. When Bruce finally returns to Gotham, he does not show obvious interest in reclaiming the family business. He is given a generous trust fund to live off. Instead, he chooses to work in Applied Sciences, using it and his coworker Lucius Fox to provide him with high-tech equipment. He takes gear originally made for military use, including body armor and a prototype armored vehicle, and uses them to create equipment for his war on crime. At the film's end when Wayne Enterprises becomes a public corporation, Bruce reveals he has become majority shareholder by purchasing the shares through various shell companies he established using his trust fund. He then fires Earle and installs Fox as the active CEO. According to Forbes' 25 Largest Fictional Companies, Wayne Enterprises had estimated sales of $31.3 billion in 2007. Wayne Tower is portrayed by the Chicago Board of Trade Building.
 Wayne Enterprises appears in Batman: Gotham Knight (which takes place between Batman Begins and The Dark Knight) specifically in "Crossfire" with Fox showcasing his new gyroscopic electromagnetic sensor that can deflect small arms fire to Bruce.
 In The Dark Knight, Fox remains as the CEO of Wayne Enterprises. The company's research and development department has produced specialized fabrics and materials, electromagnetic gyroscopic navigational satellite systems (as shown on Batman: Gotham Knight), antihemorrhagic agent, radiation stamping technology, and rotor blades made of metal composites that have low radar signature and special acoustic design. As in Batman Begins, Bruce continues to utilize the resources of his company to aid his vigilante work as Batman. For example, he has Fox arrange a business meeting with a Chinese mogul Lau (Chin Han) in order to "get a closer look" at Lau's business practices and confirm his own suspicions that Lau and his company, LSI Holdings, had been cooperating with the Gotham underworld in money laundering schemes. He also had Fox build components for his new Batsuit. Batman also has used the company's radiation stamping technology to lightly irradiate a large quantity of money for Gordon and his detectives to use to track the mobs' money and identify the banks that are aiding them. Later on, Batman uses a sonar technology developed by Fox in order to track down and capture the Joker. In addition, a subplot of the film involves Wayne Enterprises' fiduciary Coleman Reese (Joshua Harto), who accidentally discovers Bruce Wayne's identity as Batman while reviewing the company's budget when he uncovers blueprints for the Tumblers, and attempts to blackmail Bruce and Fox. Fox gets Reese to back down by questioning his decision to blackmail a man he believes to be a violent vigilante. Later, Bruce "accidentally" saves Reese from the Joker's attention. Ultimately, Reese does not reveal his discovery and resigns from Wayne Enterprises. By this point in time, Wayne Tower is represented by 330 North Wabash.
 By the time of The Dark Knight Rises, Wayne Enterprises is depicted to be in tough times after the company invests huge sums of money into researching a new fusion power project, but Bruce Wayne subsequently mothballs it due to concerns that the resulting fusion reactor could be weaponised. A series of investments falsely made by Bane in Bruce's name puts Wayne Enterprises further into financial ruin, opening an opportunity for business magnate John Daggett to buy the company. Bruce enlists Miranda Tate and her wealth to buy controlling interest in the company which helps him save it and to protect the nuclear reactor by supporting her as the new chair and CEO of the company, unaware that she was Ra's al Ghul's true child and he was therefore giving her everything she needed to complete her plan. With her and Bruce's eventual deaths, all of his assets and majority share holding are placed in trust and sold to pay his debts. As a result, the company continues to run and the position of CEO is returned to Fox. The Wayne Foundation was also mentioned as sponsoring a Gotham City orphanage, where Detective John Blake was raised, and whose funding was cut following the company's fall from profitability.

DC Extended Universe

 During the film Man of Steel, General Zod destroys a satellite, which has the Wayne Enterprises logo on it. The Wayne Enterprises logo is the same one used in The Dark Knight Trilogy.
 In Batman v Superman: Dawn of Justice, a subsidiary of Wayne Enterprises, called Wayne Financial appears and features a different logo. A Wayne Tower based in Metropolis is destroyed during the events of Man of Steel.
 In Suicide Squad, Wayne Enterprises is responsible for creating the explosive devices used to control Task Force X. In the film, the Joker breaks into a Wayne Enterprises facility to abduct Dr. Van Criss to defuse Harley Quinn's explosive.
 In Wonder Woman, both an armored truck and employees featuring the Wayne Enterprises logo deliver to Diana the original version of a photo that features her, Steve Trevor and their companions during Diana's exploits in World War I.

Joker
Wayne Enterprises appears in the film Joker as Wayne Investments where three employees of the company attack Arthur Fleck/Joker at a Gotham City subway train until he kills all three of them. The company's CEO Thomas Wayne, his wife Martha Wayne and their son Bruce Wayne appear as well with the former being the mayor of Gotham City until he is killed alongside his spouse during a riot.

The Batman
In The Batman, the Wayne family moved into Wayne Tower after Thomas Wayne had Wayne Manor turned into an orphanage. Bruce would use the Tower as his base of operations. It was represented by the Tribune Tower in Chicago.

Video games
 Wayne Enterprises Tower appears in DC Universe Online. It is located in the Diamond District while the original Wayne Enterprises building is located in East End.

Batman: Arkham

 Wayne Enterprises Tower appears in the Batman: Arkham games – Batman: Arkham Asylum, Arkham City, Arkham Origins, and Arkham Knight. In the first game, Wayne Enterprises is the answer to one of Riddler's riddles: "Gotham's greatest family towers over the city". In the fourth game, Wayne Enterprises can be visited either by travelling to the top of the building via Bat-Grapple or entering the underground parking garage in the Batmobile, allowing Batman to talk with Lucius (Who is clearly aware of his identity in this continuity). One mission includes Tommy Elliot attempting to take control of the company by entering the building after giving himself plastic surgery to resemble Bruce Wayne, but this plan fails as the computers will only respond to a retinal scan from Bruce, with Elliot's attempt to take Lucius Fox hostage backfiring when Batman intervenes. Following the supposed death of Bruce Wayne, it is revealed that Lucius Fox now owns all of Wayne Enterprises.

Lego Batman

 Wayne Enterprises' research labs serves as one of the villain levels in Lego Batman: The Video Game, during which Riddler and Two-Face break into them to steal a prototype laser weapon.
 Wayne Tower appears in Lego Batman 2: DC Super Heroes. It is seen being attacked by the team of Lex Luthor and The Joker until the Justice League stopped them from destroying it. It was rebuilt afterwards.

References

External links
 
 Batman Begins at Warner Bros.
 
 The Dark Knight at Warner Bros.

DC Comics organizations
Fictional companies
1979 in comics
Fictional elements introduced in 1979